Herbert Lee may refer to:
Herbert Lee (cricketer), English cricketer
Herbert Lee (activist), American civil rights activist
Herbert Lee (cyclist), British cyclist

See also

Bert Lee (disambiguation)